Kaachi (stylised as KAACHI) was a British girl group formed by FrontRow Records. Their final line-up consisted of Nicole and Chunseo. They debuted on 15 April 2020 with the digital single "Your Turn". Originally debuting as a 4-member group, Dani left the group on 23 July 2021 and Coco left the group on 3 September 2022.

History

Pre-debut 
Kaachi was formed in January 2020 through FrontRow Records. The original lineup consisted of members Nicole, Dani, Chunseo, and KG, all of whom were former members of UJJN; a British K-pop dance cover group. However, KG quietly departed from the group due to personal reasons sometime in January and was replaced by Miso. On 29 February 2020, Kaachi performed their debut song "Your Turn" prior to its release at Super Kpop Weekends in London. Miso left the group in March 2020, and was replaced by Coco.

2020–2023: "Your Turn", "Photo Magic", lineup changes and disbandment 
In February of 2020, FrontRow Records announced that Kaachi's debut song would be named "Your Turn". The single was officially released on 15 April 2020, with the music video being released on 29 April. The song has been described as a fusion of Europop, K-Pop and hip-hop. The song was criticized by K-Pop fans over their alleged lack of training, three of the group's four members lacking Korean heritage, and for taking shortcuts in the Korean idol training process. However, many also praised the group for its ground-breaking concept of K-Pop being open to people from around the globe and because the group took a new spin on the genre. On 29 April 2020, Kaachi's producer, Monica Lee, uploaded a video on YouTube to clarify the truth about Kaachi, including rumours that the group were formed by Simon Cowell and that they had made fun of other idols. On 26 May 2020, Kaachi were featured in their own mini-documentary, The UK’s First K-Pop Girl Group, which was posted by Channel 4 onto the networks’ social media pages. The episode focused on the hours before and during the filming of the music video shoot of their debut single. The mini-documentary drew criticism to the girls, due to them not finishing the choreography to the song until the night before the music video was filmed. Rumours had also circulated about the group plagiarising other K-Pop groups, which also drew more negative attention towards them. 

On 24 September 2020, it was announced that Kaachi would be making their first comeback with the pre-release single "Photo Magic" in late October, which would be included on the group’s first mini-album that had been slated for a 2021 release. The group performed in Joy Ruckus Club's Asian-American virtual music festival on 17 October 2020. On 4 November, their second single "Photo Magic" was released along with a music video. The song was described as a fusion of British grime, hip-hop rhythms, and energetic K-Pop by the song’s producers. On 1 January 2021, they performed the song at the London's New Year's Day Parade. Kaachi released the Spanish versions of their previous two releases; "Your Turn" and "Photo Magic", on 30 June.

On 23 July 2021, FrontRow Records confirmed that Dani's contract had expired and that she would leave the group, with Dani also making a statement on her social media accounts about her departure.  On 19 August, they released their third single "The One Thing", the first as a trio since Dani's departure from the group. Kaachi appeared at the Joy Ruckus Club's New Beginnings with K-Pop Superfest festival on 27 August, where they premiered the song "Extra Special", which would be officially released on 2 September. On 25 October 2021, the group released their fifth single, "Get Up", along with a music video. The song is a remake of a song by Baby Vox of the same name, and was also performed at the Joy Ruckus Club's New Beginnings with K-pop Superfest earlier in the year. The group performed live at the London New Year's Day Parade 2022 on 1 January, where they sang "Get Up".

In July 2022, the group performed at the TLP Summer Con in Tenerife. On 2 September, a statement was posted onto Kaachi's social media pages stating that Coco had left the group.  In November, they participated in STAR IZ BORN; a virtual reality K-Pop festival in Metaverse. 

On 1 January 2023, the duo performed the song "The One Thing" at the London New Year's Day Parade. 

On 28 February 2023, the group had officially disbanded after members Nicole and Chunseo decided to depart from the group and the label.  

On 28 February 2023, Nicole, Chunseo (Ruth), and Coco will still do music alongside with each other with their independent group ATTI.

Members

Final line-up 
 Nicole (니콜) (Original Member)
 Chunseo (준서) (Original Member)

Past members 
 Dani (다니) (Original Member; Left 23 July 2021)
 Coco (코코) (Joined 28 March 2020; Left 2 September 2022)`

Pre-debut  
 Miso (미소) (Joined 1 February 2020; Left 15 March 2020)
 KG (Original Member; Left 31 January 2020)

Timeline

Purple line (vertical) indicates a release.

Discography

Singles

Notes

References 

Musical groups established in 2020
British musical trios
K-pop-inspired girl groups from England
2020 establishments in England